Catenary Nunatak is a nunatak located  southwest of Monastery Nunatak on the south side of the Quartermain Mountains, Victoria Land, in the Antarctic. 

The name was selected in 1993 by the New Zealand Geographic Board. It is one of a group of names derived from terms used in surveying - a catenary being the curve in which a survey chain hangs when it is suspended between two points at the same level.

References 

Nunataks of Victoria Land
Scott Coast